"Tucson Train" is a 2019 song by Bruce Springsteen, released as a single from the album Western Stars. It is the third track on the album.

Release and reviews
The song was released as a single, with an official BW video that shows him playing with a large band, on May 30, 2019. "Tucson Train" has been described as a "rootsy tune" that combines Springsteen's guitar playing with a horn section and a string section. It tells the story of a construction worker, who left San Francisco for a new life in Arizona, having a volatile relationship with his lover, whom he left behind in California. After the story with the woman fell apart, they found they missed each other; now, "tired of the pills and the rain", he rejoices that "baby's coming in on the Tucson train". As many Springsteen songs, it features the element of the train.

Chart performance

References

2019 singles
2019 songs
Bruce Springsteen songs
Songs written by Bruce Springsteen
Song recordings produced by Ron Aniello